This is an incomplete list of authors who have written libretti for operas. Only librettists with their own articles in Wikipedia are listed. The name of the composer of each opera is also given.

List of operas by librettist's last name

A
Giuseppe Adami (1878–1946)
 for Giacomo Puccini: La rondine, Il tabarro, Turandot (with Renato Simoni)
 for Riccardo Zandonai: La via della finestra
 for Franco Vittadini: Anima allegra, Nazareth

Jules Adenis (1823–1900)
 with Henri Caïn
 for Umberto Giordano: Marcella
 with Charles Grandvallet
 for Jules Massenet: La grand'tante
 for Jacques Offenbach: Un postillon en gage
 with J Rostaing
 for Ernest Guiraud: Sylvie
 with Jules-Henri Vernoy de Saint-Georges
 for Georges Bizet: La jolie fille de Perth
 with A Silvestre and L Bonnemère
 for Henry Charles Litolff: Les templiers

Franco Alfano (1875–1954)
for his own music: Sakùntala

Louis Anseaume (1721–1784)
alone
for Egidio Duni: L'école de la jeunesse, Le peintre amoureux de son modèle
for Christoph Willibald Gluck: L'île de Merlin, ou Le monde renversé, L'ivrogne corrigé
for André Grétry: Le tableau parlant
with Thomas Hales
for André Grétry: Le jugement de Midas
with Pierre-Augustin Lefèvre de Marcouville:
for Christoph Willibald Gluck: La fausse esclave
for Jean Louis Laruette: La fausse aventurière
for Pieter van Maldere: Le Médecin de l'amour

George Antheil (1900–1959)
for his own music: Transatlantic

Guillaume Apollinaire (1880–1918)
used by Francis Poulenc: Les mamelles de Tirésias

W. H. Auden (1907–1973)
alone:
for Benjamin Britten: Paul Bunyan
with Chester Kallman (1921–1975)
for Hans Werner Henze: The Bassarids, Elegy for Young Lovers
for Nicolas Nabokov: Love's Labour's Lost
for Igor Stravinsky: The Rake's Progress

B
Ingeborg Bachmann (1926–1973)
for Hans Werner Henze: Der junge Lord, Der Prinz von Homburg

Béla Balázs (1884–1949)
for Béla Bartók: Bluebeard's Castle

Luigi Balocchi (1766–1832)
for Gioachino Rossini: Il viaggio a Reims, Le siège de Corinthe (with Alexandre Soumet), Moïse et Pharaon (with Étienne de Jouy)

Henri Auguste Barbier (1805–1882)
for Hector Berlioz: Benvenuto Cellini (with Léon Wailly)

Jules Barbier (1825–1901)
alone:
for Jacques Offenbach: The Tales of Hoffmann
for Camille Saint-Saëns: Le timbre d'argent
with Michel Carré:
for Charles Gounod: La colombe, Faust, Le médecin malgré lui, Philémon et Baucis, Polyeucte, La reine de Saba, Roméo et Juliette
for Giacomo Meyerbeer: Le pardon de Ploermel
for Ambroise Thomas: Mignon, Hamlet, Françoise de Rimini

Pierre Beaumarchais (1732–1799)
used by Antonio Salieri: Tarare

Vladimir Belsky (1866-1946)
for Nikolai Rimsky-Korsakov: Sadko (in part), The Tale of Tsar Saltan, The Legend of the Invisible City of Kitezh and the Maiden Fevroniya, The Golden Cockerel

Sem Benelli (1877–1949)
for Umberto Giordano: La cena delle beffe
for Italo Montemezzi: L'amore dei tre re, L'incantesimo

Hector Berlioz (1803–1869)
for his own music: Les Troyens, Béatrice et Bénédict

Giovanni Bertati (1735–1815)
for Domenico Cimarosa: Il matrimonio segreto
for Giuseppe Gazzaniga: Don Giovanni Tenorio

Thomas Betterton (1635–1710)
for Henry Purcell: Dioclesian, The Fairy-Queen (probably)

Robin Blaser (born 1925)
for Harrison Birtwistle: The Last Supper

Édouard Blau (1836–1906)
alone:
for Édouard Lalo: Le roi d'Ys
with Georges Hartmann and Paul Milliet:
for Jules Massenet: Werther
with Adolphe d'Ennery and Louis Gallet:
for Jules Massenet:Le Cid

Arrigo Boito (1842–1918)
 for Giuseppe Verdi: Simon Boccanegra (revised version), Otello, Falstaff
 for Amilcare Ponchielli: La Gioconda (writing under the pseudonym/anagram Tobia Gorrio)
 for his own music: Mefistofele, Nerone
 for Franco Faccio: Amleto

Jean-Nicolas Bouilly (1763–1842)
for Luigi Cherubini: Les deux journées
for André Grétry: Pierre le Grand
for Étienne Méhul: Le jeune Henri, Une folie, Héléna, Valentine de Milan,

Bertolt Brecht (1898–1956)
for Paul Dessau: Die Verurteilung des Lukullus
for Kurt Weill:
alone: Der Jasager, Rise and Fall of the City of Mahagonny,
with Elisabeth Hauptmann: Happy End, The Threepenny Opera

Georg Büchner (1813–1837)
used by Alban Berg: Wozzeck

Francis Burnand (1836–1917)
for Arthur Sullivan: The Chieftain, The Contrabandista, Cox and Box
for Edward Solomon: Domestic Economy, Pickwick, The Tiger

Giovanni Francesco Busenello (1598–1659)
for Claudio Monteverdi: L'incoronazione di Poppea
for Francesco Cavalli: Gli amori d'Apollo e di Dafne, La Didone, La prosperita di Giulio Cesare dittatore , Statira principessa de Persia

Ferruccio Busoni (1866–1924)
for his own music: Arlecchino, Die Brautwahl, Doktor Faust, Turandot

C
Massimo Cacciari (born 1944)
for Luigi Nono: Prometeo

Louis de Cahusac (1706–1759)
for Jean-Philippe Rameau: Anacréon (first Rameau opera by that name), Les Boréades, Les fêtes de l'Hymen et de l'Amour, Naïs, La naissance d'Osiris, Zaïs, Zoroastre

Henri Caïn (1859–1937)
alone:
for Jules Massenet: Cendrillon, La Navarraise, Don Quichotte, Roma, Sapho
for Franco Alfano: Cyrano di Bergerac
with de Croisset – see Francis de Croisset

Italo Calvino (1923–1985)
for Luciano Berio: La vera storia, Un re in ascolto

Ranieri de' Calzabigi (1714–1795)
for Christoph Willibald Gluck: Alceste, Orfeo ed Euridice, Paride ed Elena

Salvadore Cammarano (1801–1852)
for Gaetano Donizetti: L'assedio di Calais, Belisario, Lucia di Lammermoor, Maria de Rudenz, Maria di Rohan, Pia de' Tolomei, Poliuto, Roberto Devereux
for Giuseppe Verdi: Alzira, La battaglia di Legnano, Luisa Miller, Il trovatore (with Leone Emanuele Bardare)
for Giuseppe Persiani: Ines de Castro
for Saverio Mercadante: Elena da Feltre, La vestale, Orazi e Curiazi, Virginia, Il reggente
for Giovanni Pacini: Saffo

Mark Campbell
 for Mason Bates: The (R)evolution of Steve Jobs
 for Iain Bell: Stonewall
 for William Bolcom: Lucrezia, Dinner At Eight
 for Julian Grant: The Nefarious, Immoral but Highly Profitable Enterprise of Mr. Burke & Mr. Hare
 for Laura Kaminsky: As One, Some Light Emerges, Today It Rains
 for Paul Moravec: The Shining
 for John Musto: Volpone, Later the Same Evening, Bastianello, The Inspector
 for Rene Orth: Empty the House
 for Roberto Scarcella Perino: A Sweet Silence in Cremona
 for Paola Prestini: Edward Tulane
 for Kevin Puts: Silent Night, The Manchurian Candidate, Elizabeth Cree
 for Stewart Wallace: Supermax

Michel Carré (1821–1872)
alone:
for Charles Gounod: Mireille
for Jacques Offenbach: La rose de Saint-Flour
with Eugène Cormon:
for Georges Bizet: Les pêcheurs de perles
 with Barbier – see Jules Barbier

Nick Cave (born 1957)
for Nicholas Lens: Shell Shock

Ernest Chausson (1855–1899)
for his own music: Le roi Arthus

Helmina von Chézy (1783–1856)
for Carl Maria von Weber: Euryanthe

Henry Fothergill Chorley (1808–1872)
for Arthur Sullivan: The Sapphire Necklace
for William Vincent Wallace: The Amber Witch

 (1873–1954)
 for Giacomo Puccini: La fanciulla del West (with )

Jean Cocteau (1889–1963)
for Arthur Honegger: Antigone
for Darius Milhaud: Le pauvre matelot
for Francis Poulenc: La voix humaine
for Igor Stravinsky: Oedipus rex

John M. Coetzee (born 1940)
for Nicholas Lens: Slow Man

Colette (1873–1954)
for Maurice Ravel: L'enfant et les sortilèges

Marco Coltellini (1719–1777)
for Christoph Willibald Gluck: Telemaco
for Hasse: Piramo e Tisbe
for Joseph Haydn: L'infedeltà delusa
for Wolfgang Amadeus Mozart: La finta semplice
for Antonio Salieri: Armida
for Tommaso Traetta: Ifigenia in Aulide, Antigona

Jeremy Commons (born 1933)
with Ivan Bootham: The Death of Venus

William Congreve (1670–1729)
used by John Eccles: Semele
used by George Frideric Handel: Semele
used by John Eccles, Daniel Purcell, Gottfried Finger and John Weldon: The Judgement of Paris

Eugène Cormon (1810–1903)
with Michel Carré
for Georges Bizet: Les pêcheurs de perles
with Hector-Jonathan Crémieux
for Jacques Offenbach: Robinson Crusoé
with Lockroy
for Aimé Maillart: Les dragons de Villars

Thomas Corneille (1625–1709)
for Marc-Antoine Charpentier: Médée
for Jean-Baptiste Lully: Bellérophon (with Bernard Le Bovier de Fontenelle)

Hector-Jonathan Crémieux (1828–1892)
with E About
for Jacques Offenbach: Le financier et le savetier
with Ernest Blum
for Jacques Offenbach: Bagatelle, La jolie parfumeuse
with Eugène Cormon
for Jacques Offenbach: Robinson Crusoé
with Philippe Gille
for Jacques Offenbach: Les bergers
with Ludovic Halévy
for Léo Delibes: Les eaux d’Ems
for Jacques Offenbach: La chanson de Fortunio, Jacqueline, Orphée aux enfers, Le pont des soupirs, Le roman comique
with Ludovic Halévy, M de Saint-Rémy and Ernest Lépine
for Jacques Offenbach: M. Choufleuri restera chez lui le . . .
with Adolphe Jaime
for Hervé: Le petit Faust
for Jacques Offenbach: Une demoiselle en loterie
with Adolphe Jaime and Etienne Tréfeu
for Jacques Offenbach: Geneviève de Brabant
with Albert de Saint-Albin
for Jacques Offenbach: La foire Saint-Laurent

Michael Cristofer (born 1945)
for Terence Blanchard: Champion

Francis de Croisset (1877–1937)
alone:
for Reynaldo Hahn: Ciboulette
 with Henri Caïn
for Jules Massenet: Chérubin

Eric Crozier (1914–1994)
for Benjamin Britten: Albert Herring, Billy Budd (with E. M. Forster), The Little Sweep

César Cui (1835–1918)
for his own music: The Captain's Daughter, A Feast in Time of Plague, Mademoiselle Fifi, The Saracen (with Vladimir Vasilievich Stasov)

D
Gabriele D'Annunzio (1863–1938)
for Pietro Mascagni: Parisina
for Alberto Franchetti: La figlia di Iorio

Lorenzo Da Ponte (1749–1838)
for Wolfgang Amadeus Mozart: The Marriage of Figaro, Don Giovanni, Così fan tutte
for Vicente Martín y Soler: L'arbore di Diana, Il burbero di buon cuore, Una cosa rara
for Antonio Salieri: Axur, re d'Ormus

William Davenant (1606–1668)
for Henry Lawes, Matthew Locke and others: The Siege of Rhodes

Giovanni de Gamerra (1743–1803)
for Wolfgang Amadeus Mozart: Lucio Silla (revised by Metastasio); Italian adaptation of The Magic Flute
for Giuseppe Sarti: Medonte, re di Epiro
for Josef Mysliveček: Il Medonte
for Antonio Salieri: Palmira, regina di Persia

Constance DeJong (born 1950)
for Philip Glass: Satyagraha

Casimir Delavigne

Germain Delavigne

Frederick Delius (1862–1934)
for his own music: Fennimore and Gerda, Irmelin, A Village Romeo and Juliet

Philippe Néricault Destouches (1680–1754)
for Jean-Joseph Mouret: Les amours de Ragonde

Eduard Devrient (1801–1877)
for Heinrich Marschner: Hans Heiling

Gaetano Donizetti (1797–1848)
for his own music: Betly, Il campanello di notte, Le convenienze ed inconvenienze teatrali, Don Pasquale (with Giovanni Ruffini)

John Dryden (1631–1700)
for Henry Purcell: The Indian Queen (with Robert Howard), King Arthur
for Louis Grabu: Albion and Albanius

E

Gottfried von Einem (1918–1996)
for his own music: Dantons Tod (with Boris Blacher)

Adolphe d'Ennery (1811–1899)
alone:
for Charles Gounod: Le tribut de Zamora
with Édouard Blau and Louis Gallet:
for Jules Massenet: Le Cid
with Jules Brésil
for Adolphe Adam: Si j'étais roi
with Philippe François Pinel Dumanoir and Jules Chantepie:
for Jules Massenet: Don César de Bazan

Victor Erofeyev (born 1947)
for Alfred Schnittke: Life with an Idiot

Hanns Heinz Ewers (1871–1943)
for Eugen d'Albert: Die toten Augen

F
Mohammed Fairouz (born 1985)

for himself: Sumeida's Song
Duncan Fallowell (born 1948)
 for Irmin Schmidt composer Gormenghast (opera)
Charles-Simon Favart (1710–1792)
 for Egidio Duni: La fée Urgèle, ou Ce qui plaît aux dames
Lorenzo Ferrero (born 1951)
for himself: Marilyn, Night, La nascita di Orfeo, La Conquista
Jacopo Ferretti (1784–1852)
for Gaetano Donizetti: L'ajo nell'imbarazzo, Il furioso all'isola di San Domingo, Olivo e Pasquale, Torquato Tasso, Zoraide di Grenata
for Saverio Mercadante: Gli amici di Siracusa, Scipione in Cartagine
for Giovanni Pacini: Cesare in Egitto
for Luigi Ricci: L'orfanella di Ginevra
for Lauro Rossi: La figlia di Figaro
for Gioachino Rossini: La Cenerentola, Matilde di Shabran
for Niccolò Antonio Zingarelli: Baldovino
Ferdinando Fontana (1850–1919)
for Giacomo Puccini: Le Villi, Edgar
E. M. Forster (1879–1970)
for Benjamin Britten: Billy Budd (with Eric Crozier)
Giovacchino Forzano (1884–1970)
for Giacomo Puccini: Suor Angelica, Gianni Schicchi
Frederick the Great (1712–1786)
for Carl Heinrich Graun: Montezuma
Christopher Fry (1907–2005)
for Krzysztof Penderecki: Paradise Lost

G
Kate Gale (born 1965)
for Don Davis: Río de Sangre

Louis Gallet (1835–1898)
for Georges Bizet: Djamileh
for Alfred Bruneau: L'attaque du moulin
for Charles Gounod: Cinq-Mars, Maître Pierre
for Jules Massenet: Thaïs, Le Cid, Le roi de Lahore
for Camille Saint-Saëns: Ascanio, La princesse jaune, Déjanire
John Gay (1685–1732)
for music arranged by Johann Christoph Pepusch: The Beggar's Opera

Richard Genée (1823–1895)
with Camillo Walzel
for Carl Millöcker: Der Bettelstudent
for Johann Strauss II: Cagliostro in Wien, Der lustige Krieg, Eine Nacht in Venedig

Ira Gershwin (1896–1983)
with DuBose Heyward:
for George Gershwin: Porgy and Bess

Antonio Ghislanzoni (1824–1893)
for Giuseppe Verdi: Aida, La forza del destino
for Amilcare Ponchielli: I Lituani

Giuseppe Giacosa (1847–1906) and Luigi Illica (1857–1919)
for Giacomo Puccini: La bohème, Madama Butterfly, Manon Lescaut (with others, including Leoncavallo), Tosca

W. S. Gilbert (1836–1911)
for Arthur Sullivan: The Gondoliers, The Grand Duke, H.M.S. Pinafore, Iolanthe, The Mikado, Patience, The Pirates of Penzance, Princess Ida, Ruddigore, The Sorcerer, Thespis, Trial by Jury, Utopia, Limited, The Yeomen of the Guard
for Thomas German Reed: Eyes and No Eyes, No Cards, Our Island Home, A Sensation Novel
for Frederic Clay: Ages Ago, Happy Arcadia, Princess Toto, The Gentleman in Black
for Alfred Cellier: The Mountebanks, Topsyturveydom
for George Grossmith: Haste to the Wedding
for Frank Osmond Carr: His Excellency
for Edward German: Fallen Fairies
for Alberto Randegger: Creatures of Impulse

Philippe Gille (1831–1901)
with Edmond Gondinet:
for Léo Delibes: Lakmé
with Henri Meilhac:
for Jules Massenet: Manon

Alvise Giusti (1709–1766)
for Antonio Vivaldi: Motezuma

Nikolai Gogol (1809–1852)
used by Modest Mussorgsky: Zhenitba (Marriage)

Carlo Goldoni (1707–1793)
used by Wolfgang Amadeus Mozart: La finta semplice
used by Niccolò Piccinni: La buona figliuola
used by Joseph Haydn: Il mondo della luna, Lo speziale, Le pescatrici
used by Baldassare Galuppi: Il filosofo di campagna
used by Ermanno Wolf-Ferrari: Il campiello, Le donne curiose, I quatro rusteghi, Gli amanti sposi, La vedova scaltra

Edmond Gondinet (1828–1888)
alone
for Léo Delibes: Le roi l'a dit
with Ernest Blum and Albert de Saint-Albin
for Hervé: Mam’zelle Gavroche
with Georges Duval:
for Robert Planquette: Les Voltigeurs de la 32ème
with Philippe Gille:
for Léo Delibes: Jean de Nivelle , Lakmé

Alice Goodman (born 1958)
for John Adams: The Death of Klinghoffer, Nixon in China

Vincenzo Grimani (1652/1655–1710)
for George Frideric Handel: Agrippina

Sydney Grundy (1848–1914)
for Arthur Sullivan: Haddon Hall
for Edward Solomon: Pocahontas, The Vicar of Bray

Nicolas-François Guillard (1752–1814)
for Christoph Willibald Gluck: Iphigénie en Tauride
for Antonio Salieri: Les Horaces
for Antonio Sacchini: Chimène, Œdipe à Colone, Arvire et Évélina

H
Daron Hagen (born 1961)
for his own music:
alone: Cradle Song, from New York Stories, Orson Rehearsed
with Barbara Grecki: A Woman in Morocco

Thomas Hales (c.1740–1780)
for André Grétry: L'amant jaloux, Le jugement de Midas

Ludovic Halévy (1834–1908)
for Jacques Offenbach: Ba-ta-clan
also see Meilhac and Crémieux

Christopher Hampton (born 1946)
for Philip Glass: Appomattox, Waiting for the Barbarians

David Harsent (born 1942)
for Harrison Birtwistle: Gawain

Georges Hartmann (1843–1900)
for Jules Massenet: Hérodiade, Werther
for André Messager: Madame Chrysanthème
for Reynaldo Hahn: L'île du rêve

Nicola Francesco Haym (1678–1729)
for Giovanni Bononcini: Calfurnia and Astianatte
for George Frideric Handel: Admeto, Amadigi di Gaula, Flavio, Giulio Cesare, Ottone, Radamisto, Rodelinda, Siroe, Tamerlano Teseo

Philip Hensher (born 1965)
for Thomas Adès: Powder Her Face

DuBose Heyward (1885–1940)
with Ira Gershwin:
for George Gershwin: Porgy and Bess

Ernest Hilbert (born 1970)
for Stella Sung: The Red Silk Thread, an Epic Tale of Marco Polo, The Book Collector
for Daniel Felsenfeld: Summer and All it Brings, The Last of Manhattan

Paul Hindemith (1895–1963)
for his own music: Die Harmonie der Welt, Mathis der Maler

Russell Hoban (born 1925)
for Harrison Birtwistle: The Second Mrs Kong

Hugo von Hofmannsthal (1874–1925)
for Richard Strauss: Die ägyptische Helena, Arabella, Ariadne auf Naxos, Elektra, Die Frau ohne Schatten, Der Rosenkavalier

François-Benoît Hoffman (1760–1828)
for Luigi Cherubini: Médée
for Nicolas Isouard: Les rendez-vous bourgeois
for Rodolphe Kreutzer: La mort d'Abel
for Jean-Baptiste Lemoyne: Nephté, Phèdre
for Étienne Méhul: Adrien, Ariodant, Euphrosine, Le jeune sage et le vieux fou, Stratonice

Basil Hood (1864–1917)
for Arthur Sullivan: The Emerald Isle (finished by Edward German after Sullivan's death), The Rose of Persia
for Arthur Bruhns (later reset by Franco Leoni): Ib and Little Christina
for Cecil Cook: The Willow Pattern
for Edward German: Merrie England, A Princess of Kensington

Victor Hugo (1802–1885)
for Louise Bertin: La Esmeralda

David Henry Hwang (born 1957)
for Philip Glass: The Voyage, 1000 Airplanes on the Roof
for Osvaldo Golijov: Ainadamar
for Howard Shore: The Fly

I
Luigi Illica (1857–1919)
for Alfredo Catalani: La Wally
for Umberto Giordano: Andrea Chénier, Siberia
for Pietro Mascagni: Iris, Isabeau, Le maschere
see also Giuseppe Giacosa

Jarosław Iwaszkiewicz (1894–1980)
for Karol Szymanowski: King Roger (with the composer)

J
Leoš Janáček (1854–1928)
for his own music: The Cunning Little Vixen, From the House of the Dead, Jenůfa, The Makropulos Affair, Destiny

Scott Joplin (1868–1917)
for his own music: Treemonisha

Étienne de Jouy (1764–1846)
for Luigi Cherubini: Les Abencérages
for Étienne Méhul: Les amazones
for Gioachino Rossini: Moïse et Pharaon (with Luigi Balocchi), Guillaume Tell (with Hippolyte Bis)
for Gaspare Spontini: Milton (with Armand-Michel Dieulafoy), La vestale, Fernand Cortez (with Joseph-Alphonse Esménard)

K
Georg Kaiser (1878–1945)
for Kurt Weill: Der Protagonist, Der Silbersee, Der Zar lässt sich photographieren

Chester Kallman see Auden

Johann Friedrich Kind (1768–1843)
for Carl Maria von Weber: Der Freischütz
for Conradin Kreutzer: Das Nachtlager in Granada

Kenneth Koch (1925–2002)
for Ned Rorem: Bertha

Eliška Krásnohorská (1847–1926)
for Bedřich Smetana: The Devil's Wall, The Kiss, The Secret, Viola

Clemens Krauss (1893–1954)
for Richard Strauss: Capriccio

L
Antoine Houdar de la Motte (1672–1731)
for André Campra: L'Europe galante
for André Cardinal Destouches: Issé
for Marin Marais: Alcyone

Ferdinand Lemaire (1832–1879)
for Camille Saint-Saëns: Samson et Dalila

Kasi Lemmons (born 1961)
for Terence Blanchard: Fire Shut Up In My Bones

Ruggero Leoncavallo (1857–1919)
for his own music: Chatterton, I Medici, La bohème, Pagliacci, Zazà
for Giacomo Puccini: Manon Lescaut (with others, including Giacosa and Illica)

Doris Lessing (1919–2013)
for Philip Glass: The Making of the Representative for Planet 8

M
Amin Maalouf (born 1949)
for Kaija Saariaho: L'amour de loin

Daniel MacIvor (born 1962)
for Rufus Wainwright: Hadrian

Maurice Maeterlinck (1862–1949)
used by Claude Debussy: Pelléas et Mélisande
used by Paul Dukas: Ariane et Barbe-bleue

Andrea Maffei (1798–1885)
for Verdi: I masnadieri

Albéric Magnard (1865–1914)
 for his own music: Bérénice, Guercœur

Jean-François Marmontel (1723–1799)
for Jean-Philippe Rameau: Acante et Céphise, La guirlande, Les sibarites
for André Grétry: Le Huron, Lucile, Zémire et Azor
for Niccolò Piccinni: Atys, Didon, Pénélope, Roland

Henri Meilhac (1831–1897)
with Philippe Gille
for Jules Massenet: Manon
with Ludovic Halévy
for Georges Bizet: Carmen
for Jacques Offenbach: Barbe-bleue, La belle Hélène, La Grande-Duchesse de Gérolstein, La Périchole, La Vie parisienne

Anne-Honoré-Joseph Duveyrier de Mélesville (1787–1865)
for Ferdinand Hérold: Zampa
with Pierre Carmouche
for Jacques Offenbach: La permission de dix heures
with Eugène Scribe
for Jacques Offenbach: La chatte métamorphosée en femme

Guido Menasci (1867–1925)
with Giovanni Targioni-Tozzetti:
for Umberto Giordano: Regina Diaz
for Pietro Mascagni: Cavalleria rusticana, I Rantzau, Zanetto

Catulle Mendès (1841–1909)
for Emmanuel Chabrier: Gwendoline
 for Claude Debussy: Rodrigue et Chimène
with Ephraïm Mikaël:
for Emmanuel Chabrier: Briséïs
for Jules Massenet: Ariane, Bacchus
for André Messager: Isoline

Gian Carlo Menotti (1911–2007)
for his own music: Amahl and the Night Visitors, The Boy Who Grew Too Fast, The Consul, The Island God, The Last Savage, The Medium, The Old Maid and the Thief, The Saint of Bleecker Street, The Telephone, or L'Amour à trois
for Samuel Barber: A Hand of Bridge, Vanessa

Joseph Méry (1798–1866)
for Giuseppe Verdi: Don Carlos (with Camille du Locle)

Olivier Messiaen (1908–1992)
for his own music: Saint François d'Assise

Pietro Metastasio (1698–1782)
used by J. C. Bach, Riccardo Broschi, Johann Adolph Hasse, Josef Mysliveček, and Giovanni Battista Pergolesi, among others: Adriano in Siria
used by Christoph Willibald Gluck, Hasse, Mysliveček, and Tommaso Traetta, among others: Antigono
used by J. C. Bach, Gluck, Hasse, Mysliveček, and Leonardo Vinci, among others: Artaserse
used by Hasse, Vinci, J. C. Bach, and Antonio Vivaldi, among others: Catone in Utica
used by Gluck, Hasse, and Mysliveček, among others: Demetrio
used by Gluck, Hasse, Niccolò Jommelli, Mysliveček, Traetta, and Vinci, among others: Demofoonte
used by Hasse, Nicola Porpora, and Vinci, among others: Didone abbandonata
used by Gluck and Wolfgang Amadeus Mozart, among others: Il re pastore
used by Gluck, Hasse, Jommelli, and Mysliveček, among others: Il trionfo di Clelia
used by Gluck, Hasse, and Porpora, among others: 
used by Gluck, George Frideric Handel, Mysliveček, and Porpora, among others: Ezio
used by Handel, Hasse, Porpora, and Vinci, among others: Alessandro nelle Indie, also known as Poro, re dell'Indie
used by Gluck, Hasse, and Mysliveček, among others: Ipermestra
used by Mozart and Mysliveček, among others: La clemenza di Tito
used by Hasse, Mysliveček, Giovanni Battista Pergolesi, Traetta, and Vivaldi, among others: L'Olimpiade
used by Hasse, Giacomo Meyerbeer, Mysliveček, Porpora, Antonio Salieri, and Vinci, among others: Semiramide riconosciuta
used by Handel, Hasse, Porpora, Vinci, and Vivaldi, among others: Siroe rè di Persia

Madeleine Milhaud (1902–2008)
for Darius Milhaud: Médée, Bolivar, La mère coupable

Nicolò Minato (ca. 1630–1698)
used by Francesco Cavalli: Orimonte
used by Francesco Cavalli, Alessandro Scarlatti and Giacomo Antonio Perti: Pompeo Magno
used by Francesco Cavalli, Giovanni Bononcini and George Frideric Handel: Xerse
used by Antonio Draghi: Leonida in Tegea, La tirannide abbatuta dalla virtù
used by Antonio Draghi and Marc'Antonio Ziani: Chilonida
used by Antonio Draghi and Georg Reutter/Antonio Caldara: La patienza di Socrate con due mogli
used by Antonio Sartorio, Antonio Draghi and Tomaso Albinoni: La prosperità di Elio Sejano

Paul Muldoon (born 1951)
for Daron Hagen: Shining Brow, Vera of Las Vegas, Bandanna, The Antient Concert

Modest Mussorgsky (1839–1881)
for his own music: Boris Godunov, The Fair at Sorochyntsi, Khovanshchina, Salammbô

N
Émile de Najac (1828–1899)
 with Paul Burani
for Emmanuel Chabrier: Le roi malgré lui
 with Paul Ferrier
for Lecocq: La vie mondaine

Charles Nuitter (1828–1899)
for Jacques Offenbach: Les bavards, Les fées du Rhin

O
Meredith Oakes (born 1946)
for Thomas Adès: The Tempest

Marc Okrand (born 1948)
for Eef van Breen: ʼuʼ

Martin Opitz (1597–1639)
for Heinrich Schütz: Dafne (lost)

John Oxenford (1812–1877)
for George Alexander Macfarren: Robin Hood, Helvellyn

P
Francesco Maria Piave (1810–1876)
for Luigi Ricci and Federico Ricci: Crispino e la comare
for Verdi: Aroldo (1857), Il corsaro (1848), I due Foscari (1844), Ernani (1844), La forza del destino (1862 first version), Macbeth (1847 first version), Macbeth (1865 second version), Rigoletto (1851), Simon Boccanegra (1857 first version), Stiffelio (1850), La traviata (1851)

Arthur Wing Pinero (1855–1934)
for Arthur Sullivan: The Beauty Stone

Myfanwy Piper (1911–1997)
for Benjamin Britten: Death in Venice, Owen Wingrave, The Turn of the Screw

James Robinson Planché (1796–1880)
for Weber: Oberon
William Plomer (1903–1973)
for Benjamin Britten: The Burning Fiery Furnace, Curlew River, Gloriana, The Prodigal Son.

David Pountney (born 1947)
for Peter Maxwell Davies: The Doctor of Myddfai, Mr Emmet Takes a Walk

Alexander Preis
for Shostakovich: Lady Macbeth of the Mtsensk district, The Nose

Sergei Prokofiev (1891–1953)
for his own music:
alone: The Fiery Angel, The Gambler, The Love for Three Oranges, Maddalena
with Mira Mendelson: Betrothal in a Monastery, The Story of a Real Man, War and Peace
with Valentin Katayev: Semyon Kotko

Alexander Pushkin (1799–1837)
used by Alexander Dargomyzhsky: The Stone Guest

Q
Philippe Quinault (1635–1688)
for Jean-Baptiste Lully: Acis et Galatée, Amadis, Armide, Atys, Cadmus et Hermione, Isis, Persée, Phaëton, Proserpine, Roland, Thésée
used by Gluck: Armide
used by Piccinni: Roland

R
Jean Richepin (1849–1926)
for César Cui: Le flibustier
for Jules Massenet: Le mage

Nikolai Rimsky-Korsakov (1844–1908)
for his own music: Christmas Eve, Kashchey the Deathless, The Maid of Pskov, May Night, The Noblewoman Vera Sheloga, Sadko, Servilia, The Snow Maiden

Ottavio Rinuccini (1562–1621)
for Caccini: Euridice
for Gagliano: Dafne
for Monteverdi: L'Arianna
for Peri: Dafne, Euridice

Michael Symmons Roberts (born 1963)
for James MacMillan: The Sacrifice

Felice Romani (1788–1865)
for Bellini: Adelson e Salvini, Beatrice di Tenda, Bianca e Fernando, I Capuleti e i Montecchi, Norma, Il pirata, I puritani, La sonnambula, La straniera, Zaira
for Donizetti: Alina, regina di Golconda, Anna Bolena, L'elisir d'amore, Gianni di Parigi, Lucrezia Borgia, Parisina, Rosmonda d'Inghilterra, Ugo, conte di Parigi
for Giacomo Meyerbeer: L'esule di Granata, Margherita d'Anjou
for Rossini: Aureliano in Palmira, Bianca e Falliero, Il turco in Italia
for Verdi: Un giorno di regno

Giulio Rospigliosi (later Pope Clement IX) (1600–1669)
for Stefano Landi: Il Sant'Alessio
for Marco Marazzoli and Virgilio Mazzocchi: Chi soffre, speri
for Luigi Rossi: Il palazzo incantato
for Michelangelo Rossi: Erminia sul Giordano
with Giacomo Rospigliosi
for Antonio Maria Abbatini and Marco Marazzoli: Dal male il bene

Gaetano Rossi (1774–1855)
 for Rossini: La cambiale di matrimonio, Tancredi, Semiramide
 for Simon Mayr: L'amor coniugale
 for Saverio Mercadante: Il giuramento
 for Meyerbeer: Il crociato in Egitto
 for Pacini: Carlo di Borgogna
 for Donizetti: Maria Padilla (with Gaetano Donizetti), Linda di Chamounix

Jean-Jacques Rousseau (1712–1778)
for his own music: Le devin du village

Pierre-Charles Roy (1683–1764)
for André Cardinal Destouches: Callirhoé
for André Cardinal Destouches and Michel Richard Delalande: Les élémens

Alphonse Royer (1803–1875)
 with Gustave Vaëz
 for Donizetti: La favorite, L'Ange de Nisida
 for Rossini and Niedermeyer: Robert Bruce
 for Verdi: Jérusalem

S
Jules-Henri Vernoy de Saint-Georges (1799–1875)
alone
for Franz Lachner: Caterina Cornaro
for Fromental Halévy: La reine de Chypre
with Jules Adenis
for Bizet: La jolie fille de Perth
with Jean-François Bayard:
for Donizetti: La fille du régiment
with François-Antoine de Planard:
for Fromental Halévy: L'éclair
with Eugène Scribe:
for Auber: Les diamants de la couronne

Emanuel Schikaneder (1751–1812)
for Mozart: The Magic Flute (1791)
for Franz Xaver Süssmayr: Der Spiegel von Arkadien (1794)
for Peter Winter: The Magic Flute's Second Part (1798)

Arnold Schoenberg (1874–1951)
for his own music: Die glückliche Hand, Moses und Aron

Eugène Scribe (1791–1861)
alone
for Auber: Le cheval de bronze, Le domino noir, L'enfant prodigue, Fra Diavolo, Gustave III, Haydée, Manon Lescaut, La muette de Portici, La part du diable
for Boieldieu: La dame blanche
for Donizetti: Dom Sébastien
for Halévy: Guido et Ginevra, La Juive
for Meyerbeer: L'Africaine, Les Huguenots, Le prophète, Robert le diable, L'étoile du nord
with Germain Delavigne
for Gounod: La nonne sanglante
with Charles-Gaspard Delestre-Poirson
for Rossini: Le comte Ory
with Charles Duveyrier
for Donizetti: Le duc d'Albe
for Verdi: Les vêpres siciliennes
with Jules-Henri Vernoy de Saint-Georges
for Auber: Les diamants de la couronne

Sandra Seaton
for William Bolcom's From The Diary of Sally Hemings

Michel-Jean Sedaine (1719–1797)
for Christoph Willibald Gluck: Le diable à quatre
for André Grétry: Aucassin et Nicolette, Guillaume Tell, Richard Coeur-de-lion
for Monsigny: Le déserteur

Peter Sellars (born 1957)
for John Adams: Doctor Atomic

Elkanah Settle (1648–1724)
for The World in the Moon (1697) and The Virgin Prophetess, or The Fate of Troy (1701)

Thomas Shadwell (c. 1642–1692)
for Matthew Locke: Psyche

William Shakespeare (1564–1616)
used by Benjamin Britten, heavily cut by Britten and Peter Pears: A Midsummer Night's Dream

Richard Brinsley Sheridan (1751–1816)
for Thomas Linley the younger and Thomas Linley the elder: The Duenna

Renato Simoni (1875–1952)
for Puccini: Turandot (with Giuseppe Adami)
 for Francesco Cilea: Il ritorno dell'amore

Montagu Slater (1902–1956)
for Benjamin Britten: Peter Grimes

Temistocle Solera (1815–1878)
for Verdi: Oberto, Conte di San Bonifacio, Nabucco, I Lombardi alla prima crociata, Giovanna d'Arco, Attila

Antonio Somma (1809–1864)
for Verdi: Un ballo in maschera

Gertrude Stein (1874–1946)
for Virgil Thomson: Four Saints in Three Acts, The Mother of Us All

B. C. Stephenson (1838–1906)
for Arthur Sullivan: The Zoo
for Frederic Clay: The Bold Recruit, Out of Sight, The Pirates Isle
for Alfred Cellier: Charity Begins at Home, Doris, Dorothy, The Masque of Pandora

Cesare Sterbini (1784–1831)
for Gioachino Rossini: The Barber of Seville, Torvaldo e Dorliska

Richard Strauss (1864–1949)
for his own music: Guntram, Intermezzo, Salome (adapted from Oscar Wilde)

Igor Stravinsky (1882–1971)
for his own music: Renard, Le rossignol

Alessandro Striggio (1573–1630)
for Monteverdi: L'Orfeo

John Millington Synge (1871–1909)
used by Ralph Vaughan Williams: Riders to the Sea

T
Giovanni Targioni-Tozzetti (1863–1934)
for Adriano Biagi: La sposa di Nino
for Umberto Giordano: Regina Diaz
for Pietro Mascagni: Amica, Cavalleria rusticana, Nerone, Pinotta, I Rantzau, Silvano, Zanetto

Nahum Tate (1652–1715)
for Purcell: Dido and Aeneas

Modest Ilyich Tchaikovsky (1850–1916)
for Eduard Nápravník: Dubrovsky
for Sergei Rachmaninoff: Francesca da Rimini
for Pyotr Ilyich Tchaikovsky: Iolanta, The Queen of Spades

Emmanuel Théaulon (1787–1841)
with 
for Luigi Cherubini: Blanche de Provence
for Ferdinando Paer: Blanche de Provence
for Franz Liszt: Don Sanche

Michael Tippett (1905–1998)
for his own music: The Ice Break, King Priam, The Knot Garden, The Midsummer Marriage, New Year

Andrea Leone Tottola (?–1831)
for Bellini: Adelson e Salvini
for Donizetti: Alfredo il grande, Il castello di Kenilworth, Gabriella di Vergy, Imelda de' Lambertazzi, La zingara
for Giovanni Pacini: Alessandro nelle Indie
for Rossini: La donna del lago, Ermione, Mosè in Egitto, Zelmira

Étienne Tréfeu (1821–1903)
with Adolphe Jaime and Hector-Jonathan Crémieux
for Offenbach: Geneviève de Brabant

V
Albert Vanloo (1846–1920)
for Edmond Audran
with William Busnach: L'oeuf rouge
for Emmanuel Chabrier
with Eugène Letterier: L'étoile, Une éducation manquée
for Alexandre Charles Lecocq
with William Busnach: Ali-Baba
with Georges Duval: La belle au bois dormant
with Eugène Letterier: La Camargo, Giroflé-Girofla, La jolie persane, Le jour et la nuit, La marjolaine, La petite mariée
for André Messager
with Georges Duval: Les dragons de l'impératrice, Les p'tites Michu, Véronique
for Offenbach
with Eugène Letterier: Mam'zelle Moucheron
with Leterrier and A Mortier: Le voyage dans la lune

Giambattista Varesco (1735–1805)
for Mozart: Idomeneo, L'oca del Cairo

Ralph Vaughan Williams (1872–1958)
for his own music: The Pilgrim's Progress, Sir John in Love

Royce Vavrek
for Du Yun: Angel's Bone
for Ricky Ian Gordon: 27
for David T. Little: JFK, Dog Days, Vinkensport, or The Finch Opera
for Missy Mazzoli: Breaking the Waves
with the composer: Song from the Uproar: The Lives and Deaths of Isabelle Eberhardt
for Gregory Spears: O Columbia

Paul Verlaine
for Emmanuel Chabrier: Fisch-Ton-Kan

Jules-Henri Vernoy de Saint-Georges (1799–1875) – see above under S

Voltaire (1694–1778)
for Rameau: La princesse de Navarre, Le temple de la gloire, Les fêtes de Ramire, Samson (lost)

W
Richard Wagner (1813–1883)
for his own music: Die Feen, The Flying Dutchman, Götterdämmerung, Die Hochzeit, Das Liebesverbot, Lohengrin, Die Meistersinger von Nürnberg, Parsifal, Das Rheingold, Rienzi, Der Ring des Nibelungen, Siegfried, Tannhäuser, Tristan und Isolde, Die Walküre

Camillo Walzel (1829–1895) pseudonym F Zell
with Richard Genée
for Carl Millöcker: Der Bettelstudent
for Johann Strauss II: Cagliostro in Wien, Der lustige Krieg, Eine Nacht in Venedig

Thornton Wilder (1897–1975)
for Paul Hindemith: The Long Christmas Dinner

Albert Willemetz (1887–1964)
for Arthur Honegger: Les aventures du roi Pausole
for Henri Christiné: Phi-Phi
for André Messager: Coups de roulis
for Maurice Yvain: Ta bouche, Là-Haut, Yes !

Ernst von Wolzogen (1855–1934)
for Richard Strauss: Feuersnot

Y
Arthur Yorinks (born 1953)
for Philip Glass: The Fall of the House of Usher, The Juniper Tree

Z
 (1873–1943)
 for Giacomo Puccini: La fanciulla del West (with )

Franco Zeffirelli (1923–2019)
for Samuel Barber: Antony and Cleopatra

Alexander von Zemlinsky (1871–1942)
for his own music: Der König Kandaules

Apostolo Zeno (1668–1750)
used by Handel: Faramondo
used by Hasse: Antioco
used by Hasse and Holzbauer: Lucio Papirio
used by Holzbauer: Il Don Chisciotte, Sesostri, re d'Egitto, Vologeso
used by Alessandro Scarlatti and Antonio Vivaldi: Griselda

Julius Zeyer (1841–1901)
for Leoš Janáček: Šárka

Bernd Alois Zimmermann (1918–1970)
for his own music: Die Soldaten

Peter Zinovieff
for Harrison Birtwistle: The Mask of Orpheus

Émile Zola (1840–1902)
for Alfred Bruneau: Messidor, L'ouragan

Stefan Zweig (1881–1942)
for Richard Strauss: Die schweigsame Frau

General sources
The New Grove Dictionary of Opera, ed. Stanley Sadie (London, 1992) 
The Oxford Dictionary of Opera, by John Warrack and Ewan West (1992), 782 pages,

See also
Literaturoper

Librettists